Thank God It's Friday, or the acronym TGIF, is a common expression used on Friday in English-speaking Western countries. It expresses gratification that the working week is nearly over, and a weekend of leisure will soon be here.

It may also refer to:
 T.G.I. Fridays, an American restaurant chain

Media and music 
Thank God It's Friday (film), a 1978 movie about disco culture
 "Thank God It's Friday" (Love & Kisses song), a 1978 song from the film of the same name
 Thank God It's Friday (soundtrack), the soundtrack to the film of the same name
 "Thank God It's Friday" (R. Kelly song), a 1996 single by R. Kelly
 "Last Friday Night (T.G.I.F.)", a 2011 single by Katy Perry

See also
 TGIF (disambiguation)
 TFI Friday